Kolsrud is a surname. Notable people with the surname include:

Dan Kolsrud, American film producer
Eileif Kolsrud (1873–1953), Norwegian educator and politician
Dag Kolsrud, keyboardist of the band One 2 Many